The 2016 Women's EuroHockey Indoor Nations Championship II was the 11th edition of the tournament. It was held from 22 to 24 January 2018 in Cambrai, France.

Russia won the tournament for the second time after topping the pool. Along with Russia, Switzerland qualified to the 2018 EuroHockey Indoor Nations Championship as the two highest ranked teams.

Qualified teams
The following teams participated in the 2016 EuroHockey Indoor Nations Championship II.

Results
''All times are local (UTC+1).

Preliminary round

Pool A

Pool B

Classification round

Pool C

Pool D

Awards

Statistics

Final standings

Goalscorers

References

Women's EuroHockey Indoor Championship II
International indoor hockey competitions hosted by France
EuroHockey Indoor Championship
EuroHockey Indoor Championship
Cambrai
EuroHockey Indoor Championship Women
Sport in Nord (French department)
Women 2